Northern Potter Junior Senior High School is a diminutive, rural, public junior senior high school located in Ulysses, Potter County, Pennsylvania. It is the sole high school operated by the Northern Potter School District. The School serves the municipalities of Ulysses, Ulysses Township, Genesee, Bingham, and Harrison as well as portions of Allegany Township and Hector Township. In 2015, enrollment was reported as 252 pupils in 7th through 12th grades. Northern Potter Junior Senior High School employed 26 teachers.

Northern Potter Junior Senior High School students may choose to attend a half day vocational training program at Seneca Highlands Area Career and Technical Center, which is located in Port Allegany, McKean County, Pennsylvania. The Seneca HIghlands Intermediate Unit IU9 provides the School with a wide variety of services like specialized education for disabled students and hearing, speech and visual disability services and professional development for staff and faculty.

Extracurriculars
The Northern Potter School District offers a variety of clubs, activities and an extensive sports program.

Sports
The District funds:

Boys
Baseball - A
Basketball- A
Cross Country - A
Soccer - A
Track and Field - AA

Girls
Basketball - A
Cross Country - A
Softball - A
Track and Field - AA
Volleyball - A

Junior High School Sports

Boys
Basketball
Cross Country
Soccer
Track and Field - added 2014

Girls
Basketball
Cross Country
Volleyball
Track and Field - added 2014

According to PIAA directory July 2014

References

External links
 Seneca Highlands Intermediate Unit 9
 Pennsylvania Interscholastic Athletic Association

Public high schools in Pennsylvania
Buildings and structures in Potter County, Pennsylvania
Education in Potter County, Pennsylvania
Public middle schools in Pennsylvania